Socialism for the rich and capitalism for the poor is a classical political-economic argument  asserting that, in advanced capitalist societies, state policies assure that more resources flow to the rich than to the poor, for example in the form of transfer payments.

The term corporate welfare is widely used to describe the bestowal of favorable treatment to big business (particular corporations) by the government. One of the most commonly raised forms of criticism are statements that the capitalist political economy toward large corporations allows them to "privatize profits and socialize losses." The argument has been raised and cited on many occasions.

Variations of the concept, include privatize profits/gains and socialize risks/losses/debts; and markets, free enterprise, private enterprise and capitalism for the poor while state protection and socialism for the rich.

History and usage 
The phrase may have been first popularized by Michael Harrington in his 1962 book, The Other America, in which he cites Charles Abrams, a well-known authority on housing.

Andrew Young has been cited for calling the United States system "socialism for the rich and free enterprise for the poor," and Martin Luther King Jr. frequently used this wording in his speeches. Since at least 1969, Gore Vidal widely disseminated the expression "free enterprise for the poor and socialism for the rich" to describe the U.S. economic policies, notably using it from the 1980s in his critiques of Reaganomics.

In winter 2006/2007, in response to criticism about oil imports from Venezuela, that country being under the leadership of Hugo Chávez, the founder and president of Citizens Energy Corporation Joseph P. Kennedy II countered with a critique of the U.S. system which he characterized as "a kind of socialism for the rich and free enterprise for the poor that leaves the most vulnerable out in the cold." Also Robert F. Kennedy Jr. has become known for expressing to large audiences that the United States is now a land of "socialism for the rich and brutal capitalism for the poor."

Economist Dean Baker expressed similar views in his book The Conservative Nanny State: How the Wealthy Use the Government to Stay Rich and Get Richer, in which he pointed out several different policy areas in which government intervention is essential to preserving and enhancing wealth in the hands of a few.

Linguist and political scientist Noam Chomsky has criticized the way in which free market principles have been applied. He has argued that the wealthy use free-market rhetoric to justify imposing greater economic risk upon the lower classes, while being insulated from the rigours of the market by the political and economic advantages that such wealth affords. He remarked, "the free market is socialism for the rich—[free] markets for the poor and state protection for the rich." He has stated that the rich and powerful "want to be able to run the nanny state" so that "when they are in trouble the taxpayer will bail them out," citing "too big to fail" as an example.

Economist Ha-Joon Chang widens the concept towards self-serving macroeconomic policies of the West that disadvantage the developing world as Keynesianism for the rich, and monetarism for the poor.

Arguments along a similar line were raised in connection with the financial turmoil in 2008. With regard to the federal takeover of Fannie Mae and Freddie Mac, Ron Blackwell, chief economist of AFL–CIO, used the expression "Socialism for the rich and capitalism for the poor" to characterize the system. In September 2008, U.S. Senator Bernie Sanders said regarding the bailout of the U.S. financial system: "This is the most extreme example that I can recall of socialism for the rich and free enterprise for the poor." The same month, economist Nouriel Roubini said: “This is again a case of privatizing the gains and socializing the losses; a bailout and socialism for the rich, the well-connected and Wall Street.” Senator Sanders also referenced the phrase during his -hour speech on the senate floor on December 10, 2010, against the continuation of Bush-era tax cuts, when speaking on the federal bailout of major financial institutions at a time when small-businesses were being denied loans.

Former U.S. Secretary of Labor Robert Reich adapted this phrase on The Daily Show with Jon Stewart on October 16, 2008: "We have socialism for the rich, and capitalism for everyone else." Comedian Jon Stewart later characterized this in a debate with Bill O'Reilly by asking, "Why is it that if you take advantage of a tax break and you're a corporation, you're a smart businessman—but if you take advantage of something that you need to not be hungry, you're a moocher?"

Journalist John Pilger included the phrase in his speech accepting Australia's human rights award, the Sydney Peace Prize, on November 5, 2009:Democracy has become a business plan, with a bottom line for every human activity, every dream, every decency, every hope. The main parliamentary parties are now devoted to the same economic policies – socialism for the rich, capitalism for the poor – and the same foreign policy of servility to endless war. This is not democracy. It is to politics what McDonald's is to food.

In 2022, economist Yanis Varoufakis offered a similar version of this phrase in his critique of the response of governments and central banks to the 2008 financial crisis and the 2021–2022 inflation surge, describing these measures as "nothing short of lavish socialism for capital and harsh austerity for labor."

See also 

 Business ethics
 Concentrated benefits and diffuse costs
 Corporate welfare
 Crony capitalism
 Economic interventionism
 Ethical consumerism
 Inverted totalitarianism
 Iron triangle (US politics)
 Lemon socialism
 Market failure
 Neoliberalism
 Neopatrimonialism
 Plutocracy
 Privatizing profits and socializing losses
 Regulatory capture
 Right-wing socialism
 Social cost
 The rich get richer and the poor get poorer
 Too big to fail
 Trickle-down economics

References

Sources 

 
 
 Chomsky, Noam, "How Free is the Free Market?" Resurgence no. 173.  November-December 1995
 
 
 
 What will real economic change look like? August 1, 2008 The Real News
 The U.S. Economy Is Socialism for the Rich
 Bakan, Joel (2004). Corporation: The Pathological Pursuit of Profit and Power, Free Press, 2004. p. 151

1962 neologisms
Adages
American political catchphrases
Capitalism
Corporate taxation
Criticism of capitalism
Distribution of wealth
Economic planning
Economic problems
Economic sociology
Economics of regulation
Law and economics
Lobbying
Market failure
Political corruption
Political economy
Privatization
Right-wing politics
Subsidies
Taxation and redistribution
Wealth